Artur Antoni Michalski (born 5 May 1962, in Warsaw) is a Polish diplomat and journalist; an ambassador to Moldova (2012–2017) and Belarus (since 2018).

Life 
Michalski has graduated from philosophy at the Warsaw Theological Academy. In 1987, he started his professional career at "Ład" ("Order") weekly, as a journalist. He was covering democratic processes in Central and Eastern Europe.

In 1990, he joined the Ministry of Foreign Affairs of Poland. Between 1991 and 1996 he was press officer at the embassy in Moscow, with a rank of Second and First Secretary. In 1996, he has been heading the Russian Unit at the Centre for Eastern Studies, Warsaw. In 1997, he became head of analogical unit at the MFA. From 2000 to 2004 he was press officer at the embassy in Washington. Following his work at the Department of the Americas (2004–2006), he was serving as a deputy ambassador in Ottawa, Canada. In 2010, he returned to the MFA, Eastern Department. From 2011, as its director. In 2012, he was nominated Poland ambassador to Moldova, ending his term in 2017. For the next year, he was director of the Eastern Department again. On 15 May 2018 he was nominated Polish ambassador to Belarus. He arrived to Minsk on 12 June 2018, and in two weeks presented his letter of credence to the President of Belarus Alexander Lukashenko.

Besides Polish, Michalski speaks fluently English and Russian. He has also communicative knowledge of Romanian language.

Works 

 Artur Michalski, Na gruzach totalitaryzmu: rozmowy o odradzaniu się chrześcijaństwa w Rosji, Warszawa: Ośrodek Dokumentacji i Studiów Społecznych, 1991.
 Artur Michalski, Raj na Ziemi kontra obóz koncentracyjny, Toruń: Wydawnictwo Adam Marszałek, 2018.

References 

1962 births
Ambassadors of Poland to Belarus
Ambassadors of Poland to Moldova
Cardinal Stefan Wyszyński University in Warsaw alumni
Living people
Diplomats from Warsaw
Journalists from Warsaw